Elachista sulcsiella is a moth of the family Elachistidae. It is found in Latvia.

References

Moths described in 2013
sulcsiella
Moths of Europe
Endemic fauna of Latvia